Sergiyevskaya is a rural locality (a village) in Markushevskoye Rural Settlement, Tarnogsky District, Vologda Oblast, Russia. The population was 143 as of 2002.

Geography 
Sergiyevskaya is located 51 km southeast of Tarnogsky Gorodok (the district's administrative centre) by road. Brusenets is the nearest rural locality.

References 

Rural localities in Tarnogsky District